Arthur Taylor (1880 – 13 November 1956) was an English cricketer.  Taylor was a right-handed batsman who bowled right-arm medium-fast.  He was born at Maltby, Yorkshire.

Despite being born in Yorkshire, it was for Warwickshire that Taylor made his first-class debut for against Sussex at the Bulls Head Ground, Coventry, in the 1913 County Championship.  He made five further first-class appearances for the county in that season, the last of which came against Leicestershire at Ashby Road, Hinckley.  In his six first-class matches, he scored 83 runs at an average of 9.22, with a high score of 17.  With the ball, he took 4 wickets at a bowling average of 34.25, with best figures of 2/10.

Outside of playing, Taylor was also an umpire.  He stood in one first-class match between Warwickshire and Worcestershire in 1919.  He died at Birmingham, Warwickshire, on 13 November 1956.

References

External links
Arthur Taylor at ESPNcricinfo
Arthur Taylor at CricketArchive

1880s births
1956 deaths
People from Maltby, South Yorkshire
English cricketers
Warwickshire cricketers
English cricket umpires
Cricketers from Yorkshire